The 1976 Furman Paladins football team was an American football team that represented Furman University as a member of the Southern Conference (SoCon) during the 1976 NCAA Division I football season. In their fourth season under head coach Art Baker, Furman compiled a 6–4–1 record, with a mark of 2–2–1 in conference play, placing tied for third in the SoCon.

Schedule

References

Furman
Furman Paladins football seasons
Furman Paladins football